Bluhm is a surname. Notable people with the surname include:

Brady Bluhm (born 1983), American actor
Heidrun Bluhm (born 1958), German politician and member of Die Linkspartei
Kay Bluhm (born 1968), East German-German flatwater canoe racer
Lou Bluhm (1940–1990), American bridge player
Neil Bluhm (born 1938), American billionaire real estate and casino magnate, philanthropist
Norman Bluhm (1921–1999), American abstract expressionist painter
Red Bluhm (1894–1952), Major League Baseball player for the Boston Red Sox
Tim Bluhm (born 1970), Californian singer/guitarist and songwriter of the rock band The Mother Hips

German-language surnames